Wilbert Tucker Woodson High School, commonly known as W.T. Woodson High School or simply Woodson, is a high school located in Fairfax County, Virginia, in the east end of the city of Fairfax, opposite the shopping center on Main Street.

The school opened in 1962 and was once the largest school in the state. It is named for W. T. Woodson, who served as Fairfax County School Superintendent from 1929 to 1961. As of 2016, the student population was roughly 2,400. Woodson has the largest campus in Fairfax County in size of area, and also houses Woodson Adult High School, a separate education facility run by FCPS that allows adults to earn their GEDs and HS diplomas. Woodson has appeared multiple times on Newsweek magazine's lists of top or best high schools, including #23 (2003), #34 (2005), #90 (2006), and #74 (2008).  Woodson has also appeared on the top high schools lists from U.S. News & World Report: #90 (2008), #116 (2013), #200 (2016), #365 (2019), and #280 (2020) 

The principal as of October 2017 is Carlyn Floyd.

Demographics 
For the 2018–19 school year, Woodson High School's student body was 51.84% white non-Hispanic, 25.03% Asian, 12.62% Hispanic, 4.60% black, and 5.91% "Other."

Renovation

Woodson began the process of renovating all of its facilities in 2005 and adding several classrooms. The project was paid for in bonds that were established in 2003 by a voter referendum. The issue of whether to renovate had been debated for several years before the plan was approved. Woodson was one of the oldest schools in Fairfax County Public Schools, as the main facilities (plumbing, heating/cooling, floors, electrical) were still fundamentally the same as they were when the structure was built. The renovations nearly doubled the square footage of the school.

The project was completed in 2009. The renovation consisted of complete renovation to all existing interior spaces, as well as adding to the performing arts and athletic wings, creating a new administration wing with a new front entrance, highlighted by a large tower and the addition of a new science classroom wing and two student drop off areas.

Activities, groups, and programs
Woodson's mascot is a Cavalier and the sports teams play in the AAA Patriot District and the Northern Region. In 1976, the Washington Diplomats of the North American Soccer League used the school's stadium as their home field.  In a Diplomats game on June 27, 1976, soccer legend Pelé, playing for the New York Cosmos, scored a goal in a game held at Woodson.

Publications
The Cavalcade is the school newspaper.  The Cavalier, Woodson's yearbook, is a AAA publication.

Communities served by Woodson
Several unincorporated areas, such as Mantua, Olde Creek, Canterbury Woods, Truro, Rutherford, Long Branch, and Wakefield Forest are served by Woodson.

Woodson in the news
On April 1, 1973, a strong tornado struck Woodson High School and ripped off the roof. It was hit on a Sunday and no injuries were reported among the 65-75 people playing basketball in the school gymnasium. The students did a split shift with Oakton High School to finish out the school year. Graduation ceremonies were held on their home football field.
A second tornado spawned by the remains of Hurricane David severely damaged the school's stadium on September 5, 1979, causing an estimated $45,000 in damage.
On October 30, 2015, five students and a teacher were injured in an accidental fire caused by a chemistry experiment. Two of the injured students were airlifted to a local hospital, one of whom was left in critical condition. The incident received coverage from the Washington Post, and New York Times. The event also prompted a statement from the U.S. Chemical Safety Board, who considered launching an investigation into the incident, but eventually opted against doing so.
On January 30, 2022, a fire broke out in one of the school's administrative buildings adjacent to the main school building. Investigators did not determine a reason for the fire, which was reported to have caused $8.8 million in damages. The remains of the building would eventually be scheduled for demolition.

Suicide and mental health crisis 
Between 2011 and 2014, six Woodson students died by suicide. Woodson continues to be considered among the most top high schools in Virginia, and some parents pointed to the school's competitive environment as a possible cause for the poor mental health of its students. Following the suicides of 2014, the Virginia officials requested assistance from the Center for Disease Control and Prevention, the primary public health agency of the US federal government. CDC officials were sent to Northern Virginia to conduct focus group activities that attempted to identify possible causes of the suicides. Woodson itself also received $50,000 in federal aid for use in implementing mental health resources for its students. Another suicide of a Woodson student was reported in 2017.

Notable alumni

Dave Aitel, CTO and Founder of Immunity, Inc.
Tommy Amaker, point guard for Duke University (1983–1987) and men's basketball coach for Seton Hall (1997–2001), the University of Michigan (2001–2007) and Harvard University (2007–present)
Bob Cesca, columnist/blogger for The Huffington Post, creator of anime series Kung Fu Jimmy Chow and web cartoon Napster Bad
Catherine Coleman, astronaut
Robert F. Godec, U.S. ambassador to Tunisia and Kenya
Clarence Goodson, former member of the United States men's national soccer team
Andy Heck, pro-football player (1989–2002), currently the offensive line coach for the Kansas City Chiefs
Michael Lahoud, former professional soccer player
Steve Marino, professional golfer
Christopher McCandless, Alaskan traveler, subject of the nonfiction work Into the Wild by Jon Krakauer and subsequent film.
Michael P. Mullin, Virginia House of Delegates Representative for the 93rd District.
Thomas J. Perrelli, Associate Attorney General of the United States under former President Obama
Jessica Rogers, Founder of iSACRA, American wheelchair racer, basketballer, and swimmer
Austin St. John, (born September 17, 1975) an American actor best known for his role on Mighty Morphin Power Rangers as Jason Lee Scott, the Original Red Power Ranger.
Tommy Steenberg, U.S. Figure Skater
Abe Thompson, former professional soccer player, all-time leader scorer at the University of Maryland, College Park with 112 points, last played with the Fort Lauderdale Strikers.
Michael Weiss, U. S. skating and Olympic champion
Jennifer Wilson, Opera Singer

References

External links

 
 Who is Wilbert Tucker Woodson?

Educational institutions established in 1962
High schools in Fairfax County, Virginia
Northern Virginia Scholastic Hockey League teams
Public high schools in Virginia
1962 establishments in Virginia